The 2011–12 season was Beitar Jerusalem's 43rd season in the Israeli Premier League. Until November 2011, Beitar played its home games at Ramat Gan Stadium because its home stadium, Teddy, was being renovated.

First team

Ligat Ha'Al (Premier League)

Regular season

Bottom playoff

State Cup

Toto Cup

Group D

Statistics

Facts

Top scorer in league : Amit Ben Shushan (7) 
Top scorer in all competitions : Amit Ben Shushan and Steven Cohen (7) 
Top assist in league : Steven Cohen (5) 
Biggest Home Win :  3-1 vs Maccabi Petah Tikva (25 March 2012) 
Biggest Away Win :  2-3 vs Maccabi Petah Tikva (10 March 2012) 
Biggest Home Losing :  1-4 vs Maccabi Haifa (21 November 2011)  
Biggest Away Losing :  3-0 vs Hapoel Haifa (1 January 2012) 
Longest winning run :  From 3 March - 8 May 2012 (8 games) 
Longest unbeating run :  From 3 March - 12 May 2012 (9 games) 
Longest losing run :  From 28 January - 20 February 2012 (3 games) 
Longest winless run :  From 7 November 2011 - 7 January 2012 (8 games) 
Highest home attendance : 17,500 vs Maccabi Haifa (21 November 2011) 
Lowest home attendance : 3,000 vs Hapoel Be'er Sheva (17 December 2011) 
Average home attendance : 6,500

Starting 11
4–3–3 Formation

References

External links
 Beitar Jerusalem website

Beitar Jerusalem F.C. seasons
Beitar Jerusalem
Beitar Jerusalem F.C.